The 2006 James Madison Dukes football team represented James Madison University in the 2006 NCAA Division I FCS football season. They were led by head coach Mickey Matthews and played their home games at Bridgeforth Stadium in Harrisonburg, Virginia. JMU finished the season 9–3 with a record of 7–1 in their final season as members of the Atlantic 10 Conference.

Schedule

References

James Madison
James Madison Dukes football seasons
James Madison Dukes football